Gong Gucheng (born December 1940) is a lieutenant general in the People's Liberation Army of China. He was an alternate member of the 14th and 15th Central Committee of the Chinese Communist Party. He was a representative of the 16th National Congress of the Chinese Communist Party. He was a member of the Standing Committee of the 10th Chinese People's Political Consultative Conference. Throughout his military career, he participated in the Vietnam War, the Battle of the Paracel Islands, and the Sino-Vietnamese War.

Biography
Gong was born in the town of Baixi, Xinhua County, Hunan, in December 1940, to Gong Guoguang, a primary school teacher, and Chen Yueying, a small merchant. He is the first of seven children. He attended Xinhua County No. 1 High School. He joined the Chinese Communist Party (CCP) in December 1958, and enlisted in the People's Liberation Army (PLA) in July 1960. He graduated from the PLA First Engineering Corps Technical School. In 1967, he was assigned to the Guangzhou Military Region, and eventually becoming chief of staff in December 1993 and deputy commander in November 1996. In 1998, he served as commander in chief of Hubei Yangtze River Flood Fighting Army, and in 1999, he served as commander in chief of Yiyang Flood Fighting Army. On August 8, 1998, the then Premier Zhu Rongji visited the disaster area in Hubei to inspect the disaster situation and hugged him closely. He retired in August 2008.

He was promoted to the rank of major general (shaojiang) in July 1990 and lieutenant general (zhongjiang) in July 1995.

References

1940 births
Living people
People from Xinhua County
People's Liberation Army generals from Hunan
People's Republic of China politicians from Hunan
Chinese Communist Party politicians from Hunan
Members of the Standing Committee of the 10th Chinese People's Political Consultative Conference
Alternate members of the 14th Central Committee of the Chinese Communist Party
Alternate members of the 15th Central Committee of the Chinese Communist Party